William Dailey Persell (born May 6, 1943) is an American bishop, formerly the bishop of the Episcopal Diocese of Chicago (1999–2008).

Early life and education
He was born in Rochester, New York on May 6, 1943, the son of Charles B. Persell, Jr., Suffragan Bishop of Albany and Dorothy Lurenz. Persell graduated from Hobart College in 1965 and the Episcopal Divinity School in 1969.

Priest
Persell was ordained deacon and priest in 1969. He became assistant priest-in-charge of St Paul's Church in Tustin, California and in 1972 he became associate rector of St John's Church in Los Angeles and then rector of the same church from 1973 till 1982. In 1982 he became rector of St Ann and Holy Trinity Church in Brooklyn, New York. He also served as President of the St Ann Center for Restoration and the Arts, Inc., Brooklyn from 1983 till 1991. In 1991 he was appointed Dean of Trinity Cathedral in Cleveland, Ohio.

Bishop
Persell was elected Bishop of Chicago on the third ballot on November 14, 1998, in St James' Cathedral, Chicago. He was consecrated on March 13, 1999, by Presiding Bishop Frank Griswold, who was also his predecessor in Chicago before being elected Presiding Bishop and Primate. In 2006 Persell announced that he would resign as Bishop of Chicago and asked for an election to take place to elect a new bishop. He resigned in 2008 upon the installation of Jeffrey Lee as the new bishop. After leaving the Diocese of Chicago, he became the assisting bishop of the Episcopal Diocese of Ohio.

See also 
 List of Episcopal bishops of the United States
 Historical list of the Episcopal bishops of the United States

References 

1943 births
Living people
Religious leaders from Rochester, New York
Hobart and William Smith Colleges alumni
Episcopal Divinity School alumni
Episcopal bishops of Chicago